Il marito ( The Husband) is a 1957 Italian-Spanish comedy film directed by Nanni Loy and Gianni Puccini, at their second and last collaboration after Parola di ladro. Alberto Sordi, who was author of the story together with Rodolfo Sonego, submitted the script to Angelo Rizzoli, that was not at all enthusiastic about the subject. Later, he met a Spanish producer, married with eleven children, who recognized himself in the story, so the film, which was initially set in uptown Rome, was shot in Madrid. In Spain the film was released with the title El Marido.

Plot 
Alberto has an unbearable wife who treats him like a nerd and that forces him to satisfy every whim of her. But Alberto decides to get respect and to prove his masculinity, initially destroying the cello's wife, the object that she loved, and after betraying her with a young woman. When the wife deliberately shatters an important deal with a rich and Alberto old widow, her husband is about to kill her in despair, but he is resoundingly beaten by his wife and sent to the hospital. At the end of the story Alberto remains meek as a child and his wife will decide his every move in the future.

Cast 
Alberto Sordi as Alberto Mariani
Aurora Bautista as  Elena, Alberto's wife
Luigi Tosi as  Ernesto Finardi
Alberto De Amicis as Aurelio
Carlo Ninchi as  Monsignor 
Marcello Giorda as On. Tocci
Pino Patti as Colonel 
Rosita Pisano as Sofia, Alberto's sister
Mario Passante as  Gargano

Plot
The small entrepreneur Alberto Mariani (Alberto Sordi) marries graduated cellist Elena Bonfanti (Aurora Bautista) and his life begins to change... for the worse. Elena is indeed a woman of many virtues with a big flaw: wanting at home the constant presence of an intrusive mother and an intrusive sister. Soon, married life reveals to be a prison for Alberto, among many waivers, loans, bills, late payments and missed contracts.

References

External links

1957 films
Commedia all'italiana
Films directed by Nanni Loy
Films directed by Gianni Puccini
Films set in Rome
Films shot in Rome
Spanish comedy films
Films with screenplays by Ruggero Maccari
1957 comedy films
1950s Italian films